Flula Borg (born 28 March 1982) is a German actor, comedian, and musician, often known simply as Flula (sometimes stylized as f|u|a), known for his comedic personality. Borg's acting career includes roles in feature films, including Pitch Perfect 2 and The Suicide Squad, as well as in a number of television shows, including Curb Your Enthusiasm and The Good Place. He has made multiple appearances on Conan and has participated in a number of other collaborations with Conan O'Brien. 

Across a wide variety of projects, he has worked with YouTube personalities such as Rhett and Link, Miranda Sings, and Smosh, as well as mainstream celebrities including Sir Mix-A-Lot, Ed Helms, and Dirk Nowitzki. In 2015, he was named one of The Hollywood Reporters Top 25 Digital Stars as well as one of Varietys 10 Comics to Watch. He lives in Los Angeles.

Film and television
In 2015, Borg co-starred in Pitch Perfect 2 as a leader of the German a cappella group Das Sound Machine (also known as DSM). This led to appearances on talk shows such as Last Call with Carson Daly, as well as the first of many appearances on the Comedy Central game show @midnight. Buddymoon, a feature film written and produced by Borg, David Giuntoli, and filmmaker Alex Simmons, and starring Borg and Giuntoli, was shown at several major film festivals in early 2016. It won the Audience Award for Best Narrative Feature at the Slamdance Film Festival and was acquired by Gravitas Ventures and Orion Pictures for theatrical release. Later in 2016, Lionsgate Films announced a development deal with Borg under which he will serve as star, executive producer, and writer of two upcoming feature films. Beginning in 2017, he has done a great deal of voice acting, appearing in roles such as Hans the Horse in Blue Sky Studios' Ferdinand and the personal assistant Maybe in Disney's Oscar-nominated feature Ralph Breaks the Internet. He also voices a part in Trolls World Tour, produced by DreamWorks Animation and released in 2020.

In addition to his film work, Borg has acted in a number of TV series, including Curb Your Enthusiasm, Workaholics, Silicon Valley, Counterpart, and The Good Place. In 2015, he co-hosted E!'s Live from the Red Carpet pre-show at the Billboard Music Awards. He has been a guest on the TBS talk show Conan several times, including an episode in which he served as Conan O'Brien's informal guide to Germany when the show traveled to Berlin for a week. In 2017, Borg's own social action special Flulanthropy premiered on the streaming channel Seeso. He has also done voice acting in several series, including Archer, The Mr. Peabody & Sherman Show, and Tangled: The Series. Borg voices a leading role as Mega Fat CEO Baby in the DreamWorks Animation/Netflix series The Boss Baby: Back in Business. In 2022 Borg guest starred on the TV series The Rookie as Skip-Tracer Randy.

Digital media
Borg has posted over 350 videos on his YouTube channel since its launch in 2007. Some of his most popular videos are his vlogs, most notably "Jennifer is a Party Pooper", "Flula in Germany", and his AutoTunes series, in which he records cover songs live in a car. His AutoTunes video with YouTube celebrity Chester See, a cover of "No Diggity" by Blackstreet, has over four million views and was nominated for a Streamy Award in 2014. He is also known for his celebrity interviews, and for creating EDM tracks from sound clips gathered during many of those interviews. Celebrities interviewed on Borg's YouTube channel include Will Ferrell and the cast of Anchorman 2, Vince Vaughn, Tina Fey, Anna Kendrick and the cast of Pitch Perfect 2, Larry King, and Michael Phelps.

In addition to his own channel, Borg has appeared on many other popular YouTube channels, including Miranda Sings, Grace Helbig, Smosh, vlogbrothers, and Madilyn Bailey. His comedic video with Flynt Flossy of Turquoise Jeep, "Taste You Like Yogurt" has over 2 million views. In 2014, Borg's YouTube channel was listed on New Media Rockstars' Top 100 Channels and he won the 2015 Streamy Award for Comedy in recognition of his humorous contributions on YouTube.

In 2018, Borg launched his podcast, BoomTime, which is produced by Cadence 13. It is directed by his frequent collaborator Alex Simmons. Notable guests have included Ed Helms, Kristen Schaal, Reggie Watts, Hanson, and "Weird Al" Yankovic.

Music
From his beginnings as a Schuhplattler dancer in Bavaria, Germany and through many years of live performance and YouTube content, Borg has always been deeply involved in music. After winning the Scion Hypeman Contest in late 2008 as its only non-American participant, he began releasing more of his own music. His 2011 single "Sweet Potato Casserole" was listed at No. 3 on Billboard's Next Big Sound chart. In the same year, his single "Dirk Nowitzki, German Moses" coincided with the Dallas Mavericks' NBA championship run and was picked up by ESPN and other mainstream outlets. In 2014, he composed the theme song for Grace Helbig's podcast, Not Too Deep, and the following year he was chosen to create the theme song for The Grace Helbig Show on E! Entertainment Television.

Also in 2015, Borg released a five-track EP titled I Want to Touch You. Videos for all of the tracks were posted to his YouTube channel. In early 2016, he released a full-length album called Animalbum, so named because all of the songs on the album are related to animals, both real and mythological. It was produced by comedian and producer of The Bachelor, Elan Gale. In 2019, Borg released a single titled 'Self Care Sunday', featuring the American comedic music group Ninja Sex Party, to Spotify.

Live performances
Borg regularly performs live music and comedy. From 2009 to 2012 he was the host and MC for College Battle of the Bands and he hosted the Chegg Textbooks & Tickets Tour in 2011. From 2013 through 2015, he hosted Bedrocktoberfest, a music festival held in Los Angeles to coincide with Oktoberfest. As a result of his success on YouTube, he has been featured four times – in 2013, 2016, 2017, and 2018 – on the main stage at VidCon. He is active on the comedy festival circuit, appearing at Just for Laughs festivals in Montreal, Toronto, and Vancouver; at SF Sketchfest in San Francisco; and at the Blue Whale Comedy Festival in Oklahoma. He has also done solo shows in a number of cities, including Seattle, Portland, and Los Angeles. In late 2018 Borg served as Conan O'Brien's DJ, opening act, and sidekick on O'Brien's 18-city comedy tour, "Team Coco Presents Conan & Friends: An Evening of Stand-Up and Investment Tips."

Selected filmography

References

External links

1982 births
Living people
Club DJs
German male musicians
Hip hop record producers
People from Erlangen
German expatriates in the United States
Streamy Award winners
Music YouTubers
Comedy YouTubers
YouTube vloggers
Male actors from Los Angeles
Musicians from Los Angeles
Comedians from California